Sreeragam is a 1995 Indian Malayalam film,  directed by George Kithu. The film stars Jayaram, Vinduja Menon, Sudheesh and Geetha in lead roles. The film had musical score by Kanhangad Ramachandran.

Cast
Jayaram as Venkiteswaran
Vinduja Menon as Rugmini
Sudheesh as Vaithi
Geetha as Indu
Nedumudi Venu as Periya Shasthri
Sukumari
Riza Bava as Narasimhan
M. S. Thripunithura as Harihara Iyer
Madhupal as Gopu
Oduvil Unnikrishnan as Indu's Father
 Meera as venkideshwarn's sister

Soundtrack
"PadavarnnaTharivalayilaki" - KJ Yesudas, KS Chithra
"Dudukugala" - Kanjangad Ramachandran, Sreepriya Chandran, Supriya Chandran
"Raavinte" - KS Chithra, Kanjangad Ramachandran
"Neelakkadakkannil" - KS Chithra, Kanjangad Ramachandran
"Sreegananaadha Sindooravarnna" - Kanjangad Ramachandran
"Omanappoonthinkal" - KJ Yesudas, Supriya Chandran
"Chalamelera" - Kanjangad Ramachandran
"Kanakaangi swaravaahini" - KJ Yesudas, Kanjangad Ramachandran
"Shambho" - Kanjangad Ramachandran
"Sree Raagam" - KJ Yesudas
"Raavinte (female)" - KS Chithra

References

External links
 
 

1995 films
1990s Malayalam-language films
Films scored by Kanhangad Ramachandran